J. William Leonard is an American administrator who was appointed Director of the Information Security Oversight Office (ISOO) on Monday, June 3, 2002.

References

Further reading

Living people
Year of birth missing (living people)